Chockalingam Raj Kumar is the founding Vice-Chancellor of OP Jindal Global University  in Sonipat, Haryana, India, and the Dean of the Jindal Global Law School, a private university, promoted by politician and businessman Naveen Jindal.

Kumar is also a member of the National Legal Knowledge Council (NLKC) in India. He was a faculty member at the School of Law of City University of Hong Kong. He has held consultancy assignments in the field of human rights and governance. He has been a Consultant to the  United Nations University, Tokyo; United Nations Development Programme; and the International Council for Human Rights Policy (ICHRP), Geneva. He has advised the Commission to Investigate Allegations of Bribery or Corruption (CIABOC) in Sri Lanka and the National Human Rights Commission of India on issues relating to corruption and good governance. He also was a research fellow at the NYU Law School  where he started dreaming of building a quality institution like Oxford and Harvard in India and met Professor Peter Shuck and Professor Norman Dorsen who helped him realize it.

Education

Kumar received a Rhodes Scholarship to study at University of Oxford, where he obtained his Bachelor of Civil Law (B.C.L.) degree; a Landon Gammon Fellow at the Harvard Law School where he obtained his Master of Laws (LL.M.) degree. He was awarded the Doctor of Legal Science (S.J.D.) by the University of Hong Kong. He also obtained a Bachelor of Laws (LL.B.) degree from the University of Delhi, India; and a Bachelor of Commerce (B.Com.) degree from the Loyola College of the University of Madras, India.

Teaching

Kumar taught courses at the City University of Hong Kong and delivered lectures at other places, including “Law of Human Rights and Civil Liberties”, “Human Rights, Development and Governance”, “Introduction to Constitutional & Administrative Law”, “Introduction to Public Law”, “Business and Law”, "labour law", and “Globalisation and Legal Research Methodology”. Kumar also taught at Meiji Gakuin University Tokyo and Toin University of Yokohama.

Books

 Corruption and Human Rights in India: Comparative Perspectives on Transparency and Good Governance (2011), published by the Oxford University Press
 Terrorism, Human Security and Development: Human Rights Perspectives (forthcoming, 2012), to be published by the United Nations University Press, approx. 300 pages (co-editor)
 Human Rights, Justice and Constitutional Empowerment (January 2007) published by the Oxford University Press
 Tsunami and Disaster Management: Law and Governance (September 2006) published by Thomson Sweet & Maxwell Asia
 Human Rights and Development: Law, Policy and Governance (July 2006) published by LexisNexis (Butterworths)

References

External links 
 https://web.archive.org/web/20120802023550/http://www.jgls.edu.in/Faculty/C.RajKumar.aspx
 http://bigthink.com/crajkumar
 https://web.archive.org/web/20090830042110/http://www.opendemocracy.net/author/C_Raj_Kumar.jsp
 https://web.archive.org/web/20110726184458/http://www.iovahelp.org/About/CRajKumar/
 https://web.archive.org/web/20091002143902/http://www.scu.edu.au/research/cpsj/human_rights/bio_kumar.html
 http://www.oup.com/us/catalog/general/subject/Law/ComparativeLawandNationalLegalSy/?view=usa&ci=9780195686913

Living people
Academic staff of Meiji Gakuin University
Harvard Law School alumni
Alumni of the University of Oxford
Indian Rhodes Scholars
Year of birth missing (living people)